Andrew Young (born 1932) is an American civil rights activist, former congressman, and former U.S. ambassador to the United Nations.

Andrew or Andy Young may also refer to:

Politics and law
 Andrew Young (British politician) (1858–1943), British MP
 Andrew Robert Young (born 1961), American diplomat, U.S. Ambassador to Burkina Faso
 Andrew Young (political operative) (born 1966), American political operative

Sports
 A. S. "Doc" Young (Andrew Spurgeon Young) (1919–1996), African American sports journalist
 Andy Young (footballer) (1925–2008), Scottish footballer
 Andrew Young (skier) (born 1992), Scottish Olympic cross-country skier
 Andrew Young (baseball) (born 1994), American baseball player

Others
 Andrew Young (poet, born 1807) (1807–1889), Scottish poet and hymnwriter
 Andrew J. Young (Medal of Honor) (1837–1910), American soldier in the American Civil War
 Andrew Douglas Young (1881–1950), Australian stockbroker
 Andrew Young (poet, born 1885) (1885–1971), Scottish clergyman and poet
 Andrew Young (mathematician) (1891–1968), Scottish mathematician and natural scientist
 Andy Young (psychologist) (fl. 1970s–present), British neuropsychologist
 Andi Young, Asian-American singer and songwriter

See also 
 Yang (surname)
 Yang (Korean surname)